Rawalakot Hawks is a franchise cricket team that represents Rawalakot in the Kashmir Premier League. Ahmed Shehzad was the captain and Arshad Khan was the coach of the team. Mohammad Amir was announced as Rawalakot Hawks’ icon player.

Squad

Season standings

Points table

League fixtures and results

Statistics

Most runs 

Source: Cricinfo

Most wickets 

Source: Cricinfo

References

Kashmir Premier League (Pakistan)